Treppo may refer to:

 Milton Treppo, an Argentine professional footballer
 Treppo Carnico, frazione of Treppo Ligosullo in the Province of Udine in the Italian region Friuli-Venezia Giulia
 Treppo Grande, municipality in the Italian region Friuli-Venezia Giulia
 Treppo Ligosullo, comune in the Province of Udine in the Italian region Friuli-Venezia Giulia